Zelvino is a rural locality (a settlement) in urban okrug Raychikhinsk city, Amur Oblast, Russia. The population was 1,410 as of 2018. There are 30 streets.

Geography 
Zelvino is located 6 km south of Raychikhinsk (the district's administrative centre) by road. Raychikhinsk is the nearest rural locality.

References 

Rural localities in Raychikhinsk Urban Okrug